Sword of the Conqueror is a 1961 Italian adventure film written and directed by Carlo Campogalliani and starring Jack Palance and Eleonora Rossi Drago.

Plot

Cast 
 Jack Palance as Alboin
 Eleonora Rossi Drago as Rosamund
 Guy Madison as Helmichis
 Carlo D'Angelo as Falisque
 Edy Vessel as Matilda 
 Andrea Bosic as King Cunimund
 Ivan Palance as Ulderico
 Vittorio Sanipoli as Wolfango
 Raf Baldassarre 	
 Guido Celano as Delfo 
 Renato Mori

References

External links

1960s historical adventure films
1960s biographical films
Italian historical adventure films
Italian biographical films
Films directed by Carlo Campogalliani
Films scored by Carlo Rustichelli
Films set in the 6th century
1960s Italian-language films
1960s Italian films
Cultural depictions of kings